The knockout stage of the 1987 Rugby World Cup began on 6 June and was completed on 14 June.

Quarter-finals

New Zealand vs Scotland

Fiji vs France

Australia vs Ireland

England vs Wales

Semi-finals

Australia vs France

New Zealand vs Wales

Third place play-off

Final

References

External links
Official Rugby World Cup Site
Full Results and Statistics at ESPN

1987 Rugby World Cup
1987–88 in French rugby union
1987 in New Zealand rugby union
1987 in Fijian rugby union
1987–88 in English rugby union
1987–88 in Welsh rugby union
1987–88 in Scottish rugby union
1987 in Australian rugby union
1987–88 in Irish rugby union